Lake Brebeneskul is a mountain lake located in the Wooded Carpathians. It has a glacial origin and is located in the Rakhiv Raion of Zakarpattia Oblast.

Description
Lake Brebeneskul has length of is 134 m, width of 28-44 m and the depth is up to 2.8 m. The area of the lake is 0.61 ha. Lake Brebeneskul has an oval shape, its shores are high, with stone talus. The resources of the lake are fed mainly by precipitation and groundwater. The river Brebeneskul flows out of the lake (a tributary of the Hoverla and the basin of the Bila Tysa). The bottom rises in an easterly direction, at a depth covered with gray silt. The water in the lake is slightly mineralized and clean, as well as transparent and relatively warm for a mountain lake.

Location
Lake Brebeneskul is located in the Rakhiv Raion of Zakarpattia Oblast on the southwestern slope of the Chornohora between the mountains Brebeneskul (2035 m) and Hutyn Tomnatyk (2016 m). It lies at the bottom of a cirque and is also part of the Carpathian Biosphere Reserve.

References 

Geography of Zakarpattia Oblast
Brebeneskul